The Catholic Herald is a London-based Roman Catholic monthly newspaper and starting December 2014 a magazine, published in the United Kingdom, the Republic of Ireland and, formerly, the United States. It reports a total circulation of about 21,000 copies distributed to Roman Catholic parishes, wholesale outlets, and postal subscribers and describes itself as "a bold and influential voice in the church since 1888, standing up for traditional Catholic culture and values".

History
The Catholic Herald was established as a weekly newspaper in 1888. It was first owned and edited by Derry-born Charles Diamond until his death in 1934. After his death the paper was bought by Ernest Vernor Miles, a recent convert to Roman Catholicism and head of the New Catholic Herald Ltd. Miles appointed Count Michael de la Bédoyère as editor, a post he held until 1962. De la Bédoyère's news editor was writer Douglas Hyde, also a convert who arrived from the Communist Daily Worker. De la Bédoyère almost went to prison for criticising what he saw as Churchill's appeasement of the "godless" Soviet Union. In the 1980s, when Peter Stanford became the editor, the publication openly supported left-wing politics in South America. Stephen Bates of The Guardian says that in the later 1990s and early 2000s under William Oddie, the publication moved to the right and published criticism of liberal bishops and Jesuits. Bates went on to say that editor Luke Coppen, installed in 2004, takes a more embracing stance towards Catholics of all political hues. During his tenure, Oddie lost a libel suit against Bates.

The online version of the magazine includes articles from the print edition of The Catholic Herald, as well as web-only content such as the coverage of Pope Benedict XVI's April 2008 trip to the United States. The site was revamped in November 2013.

In December 2014 it became a magazine, with a revamped website covering breaking news. "The" was dropped from the title and the magazine started being known as Catholic Herald. A relaunch party on 11 December 2014 was attended by Cardinal Cormac Murphy-O'Connor and Princess Michael of Kent. Until recently, the magazine was owned by Sir Rocco Forte and Lord Black of Crossharbour. In May 2019, Black sold his 47.5% share in the Herald to Brooks Newmark, a homelessness campaigner who was previously the Conservative Member of Parliament for Braintree and William Cash, the publisher and author.

The Scottish Catholic Observer, Britain's oldest religious newspaper founded in 1885, is owned by the Catholic Herald.

A US edition of the Catholic Herald was launched on 16 November 2018. The US edition is owned by Sir Rocco Forte, William Cash, Brooks Newmark, and Robert Wargas, who started and ran the company as US CEO. Its existence was short-lived as, owing to low numbers of subscribers and the resignation of editor-in-chief Damian Thompson and the rest of the US staff in July 2019 over disputes with the magazine's ownership over the U.S. edition's editorial direction, the Catholic Herald closed its Washington, D.C. offices in March 2020.

Shortly after Dan Hitchens took on the position as editor in 2020, the newspaper revealed that it would be publishing on a monthly basis, a change from its previous weekly format. Hitchens stated that the change would provide the newspaper with the opportunity to expand its scope and publish more material online.

In April 2020, with the churches closing and lockdown announced in the UK because of COVID-19 pandemic, the US weekly print edition was merged into the UK print edition to create an international magazine.

Editors
Its editors have included:

Contributors

Contemporary contributors

Past contributors

 Kaikhosru Shapurji Sorabji

Past cartoonists
 Mark Haddon
 John Ryan

References

External links
 

1888 establishments in England
Newspapers published in London
Publications established in 1888
Religious newspapers published in the United Kingdom
Catholic newspapers
Catholic magazines
Conservative media in the United Kingdom